Port Macquarie-Hastings Council is a local government area in the Mid North Coast region of New South Wales, Australia.

The area is located adjacent to the Hastings River, the Pacific Highway, the Oxley Highway and the North Coast railway line. Major population centres in the local government area are Port Macquarie, Camden Haven, Wauchope, Lake Cathie and Kendall.

The mayor of the Port Macquarie-Hastings Council since 4 August 2017 is Cr. Peta Pinson, an independent politician.

Port Macquarie suburbs 
 Blackmans Point
 Port Macquarie CBD (not a suburb)
 Fernbank Creek
 Flynns Beach
 Innes View
 Lake Innes
 Limeburners Creek
 North Shore
 Port Macquarie
 Port Macquarie West
 Sancrox
 Sovereign Hills
 Tacking Point
 The Hatch
 Thrumster

Towns and localities 

Towns and localities (including Port Macquarie suburbs) in the Port Macquarie-Hastings Council are:

Demographics

At the 2011 Census, there were  people in the Port Macquarie-Hastings local government area, of these 48.1% were male and 51.9% were female. Aboriginal and Torres Strait Islander people made up 3.3% of the population, slightly higher than the national average. The median age of people in the Port Macquarie-Hastings Council area was 47 years; some ten years higher than the national median. Children aged 0 – 14 years made up 17.8% of the population and people aged 65 years and over made up 24.7% of the population. Of people in the area aged 15 years and over, 52.4% were married and 14.7% were either divorced or separated.

Population growth in the Port Macquarie-Hastings Council area between the 2001 Census and the 2006 Census was 6.68%; and in the subsequent five years to the 2011 Census was 6.23%. When compared with total population growth of Australia for the same periods, being 5.78% and 8.32% respectively, population growth in the Port Macquarie-Hastings local government area was generally on par with the national average. The median weekly income for residents within the Port Macquarie-Hastings Council area was slightly below the national average.

At the 2011 Census, the proportion of residents in the Port Macquarie-Hastings local government area who stated their ancestry as Australian or Anglo-Celtic exceeded 83% of all residents (national average was 65.2%). In excess of 64% of all residents in the Port Macquarie-Hastings Council area nominated a religious affiliation with Christianity at the 2011 Census, which was higher than the national average of 50.2%. Meanwhile, as at the Census date, compared to the national average, households in the Port Macquarie-Hastings local government area had a significantly lower than average proportion (3.6%) where two or more languages are spoken (national average was 20.4%); and a significantly higher proportion (93.7%) where English only was spoken at home (national average was 76.8%).

Council

Current composition and election methods
Port Macquarie-Hastings Council is composed of nine councillors, including the mayor, for a fixed four-year term of office. The mayor is directly elected while the eight other councillors are elected proportionally as one entire ward. The most recent election was held on 10 September 2016, and the makeup of the council is as follows:

On 8 May 2017, the elected mayor since 2012, Peter Besseling, resigned effective immediately to take up an executive business position. Deputy Mayor Lisa Intemann served as acting mayor until a by-election was held for the mayoral position on 29 July 2017. On 4 August 2017, the final results were declared and Peta Pinson became mayor.

The current council, elected in 2021, is:

History
Local government in the Hastings region started with the passage of the District Councils Act 1842, which allowed for limited local government in the form of a warden and between 3 and 12 councillors to be appointed by the Governor. Between July and September 1843, 28 such entities had been proclaimed by Governor George Gipps. Due to various factors, the district councils were ineffective, and most had ceased to operate by the end of the decade.

After the enactment of the Municipalities Act of 1858, which gave the councils more authority and which allowed for residents to petition for incorporation of areas and also to elect councillors, the town of Port Macquarie, population 984, petitioned to be incorporated as a municipality twice: in 1859 and again in 1867; but on both occasions, counter-petitions from other residents prevented it from being incorporated. Finally, on 15 March 1887, the Port Macquarie Municipal District was proclaimed, with the first elections on 25 May 1887 electing James McInherney as the first mayor.

The Local Government (Shires) Act 1905 enabled the Shire of Hastings, based in the town of Wauchope, to come into being in June 1906, in time for elections in November 1906. The first Shire President was James O'Neill.

In 1981, the two councils were amalgamated to form the Municipality of Hastings, with Norm Matesich becoming the council's inaugural mayor. In 1991, the council moved into its present premises in Burrawan Street, Port Macquarie. In 2005, the name was changed to Port Macquarie-Hastings following a community survey, showing that many people thought that the new name would better reflect the area.

Glasshouse controversy

On 27 February 2008 the Minister for Local Government, Paul Lynch, dismissed the council and appointed an administrator, Dick Persson. The dismissal of council was made after alleged mishandling of a project initiated in 2001 to build a cultural and entertainment centre, known to locals as the Glasshouse. The project, initially a joint venture with the management of the neighbouring shopping centre, Port Central, was initially expected to cost the Council A$7.3 million, but by late 2007, despite the centre not yet having opened, the costs had blown out to over A$41.7 million, with interest repayments likely to extend the council's liability to A$66 million. On 27 July 2007, a full public inquiry was announced by the Minister for Local Government, which reported back in February 2008.

The inquiry report found that the council had failed to provide appropriate financial and project management and had lost control of the costs, that the project costs had harmed the council's ability to provide services and amenities to the community, and that the council's "communications management strategies" had resulted in inadequate consultation with the public or appropriate regard to their concerns. The outgoing mayor, Rob Drew, was critical of the process throughout, maintaining that errors had been made and misinformation had been accepted as fact; however, the New South Wales Urban Task Force, a property development lobby group, believed the dismissal served as a warning to other councils to stick to "core responsibilities". In 2009 it was revealed that the Glasshouse would cost ratepayers around A$6 million a year to run.

See also

Local government in New South Wales

References

External links

 
Local government areas of New South Wales
Mid North Coast
Port Macquarie